James William "Big Jim" Whatley (March 11, 1913 – May 31, 2001) was an American football, basketball and baseball player and coach.
He served as the head football coach at Western Carolina University from 1939 to 1941, after playing minor league baseball for the Jackson Senators of the Cotton States League in 1937 and the Opelousas Indians of the Evangeline Baseball League from 1937 to 1938.

Head coaching record

Football

References

External links
 
 
 

1913 births
2001 deaths
American football tackles
American men's basketball players
Baseball first basemen
Centers (basketball)
Alabama Crimson Tide baseball players
Alabama Crimson Tide football players
Alabama Crimson Tide men's basketball players
Brooklyn Dodgers (NFL) players
Georgia Bulldogs baseball coaches
Georgia Bulldogs basketball coaches
Jackson Senators players
Ole Miss Rebels football coaches
Ole Miss Rebels men's basketball coaches
Opelousas Indians players
Western Carolina Catamounts football coaches
Western Carolina Catamounts men's basketball coaches
People from Alexander City, Alabama
Players of American football from Alabama
Baseball players from Alabama
Basketball coaches from Alabama
Basketball players from Alabama